W.B. Brydon (born William Brydon Bell, 20 September 1933), is a British actor.

Brydon is primarily known as an actor, best known for the feature films The Age of Innocence (1993) and Trading Places (1983) and the television miniseries The Adams Chronicles (1976).

Brydon provided the voice-over narration for many commercials, including ads for Oxy Skin Care products from the 1980s through the mid-1990s. His other voice work included ads for Raid insecticide, Fashion Bug clothing stores and the Shell MasterCard from Chemical Bank.

Filmography

References

External links
 

1933 births
Living people
Male actors from Newcastle upon Tyne
English male voice actors
English male film actors